The Lockhart Tea Museum is located in Munnar, which was originally constructed in 1936. The museum was opened to the public on 22 January 2014.

The museum is part of the Lockhart Estate, which is one of the earliest tea plantations in High Range (Munnar), established by Baron John Von Rosenberg and his son, Baron George Otto Von Rosenberg in 1879. Initially they planted cinchona then coffee and afterwards tea.

The building, which houses the museum, was constructed in 1936. The Lockhart Tea factory produces about 20 million kilograms of tea annually and is owned by Harrisons Malayalam Limited, one of South India's largest tea cultivators. The factory allows public visits during regular working hours, allowing visitors the opportunity to observe the various stages of tea processing. The museum houses photographs and machinery that was used in earlier days of tea production.

The factory and museum are located on the slopes of Chokarmudy, one of South India's highest peaks, from which the entire valley of Lockhart can be seen.

References 

Munnar
Tea museums
Tea industry in Kerala
Museums in Kerala
Museums established in 2014
Buildings and structures in Idukki district
Tourist attractions in Idukki district
Education in Idukki district